Elodie Keene (born April 10, 1949 in Berkeley, California) is an American film director, television director, producer and editor. As a television director, her credits include ER, NYPD Blue, The Practice, Ally McBeal, Charmed, Felicity, The Wire, House, M.D., The Closer, and Nip/Tuck, among other series.

She has won three Primetime Emmy Awards, two for best dramatic series and one for best editing in a single camera series, all for her work on L.A. Law. Elodie Keene is the daughter of Yvonne (née Cyr) and Jim Keene. Her mother was of Acadian, German, and Scottish descent. Her parents divorced in 1953 and her mother remarried to Jim San Jule in 1954 until their divorce in 1970. She has three siblings: Philip Keene (born 1941), Christopher Keene (born 1946), and Tamsen (née San Jule) Calhoon (born 1956). Her mother remarried to biochemist Daniel E. Koshland Jr. in 2000, of the Haas family, the owners of Levi Strauss & Co.

Filmography

Director

References

External links
 

American television directors
Television producers from California
American women television producers
Film directors from California
1949 births
Living people
Emmy Award winners
American women film directors
American women television directors
People from Paso Robles, California
Haas family
American people of Acadian descent
American people of Scottish descent
American people of German descent